Margery Pitt Withers (13 January 1890 – 1966) was an Australian artist.

Biography 
Born in England to Fanny Flinn and the Australian landscape artist Walter Withers, Margery was brought to Australia aged six months to live at the Charterisville estate in East Ivanhoe, Victoria. Her father worked as an art master at various schools in Melbourne including the Presbyterian Ladies' College, Ruyton Girls' School, the Melbourne Grammar School and Emma Bartlett Cook's Private Girl's School. Margery Withers studied art at the National Gallery School and the Working Men's College. At the National Gallery School, Withers won nine prizes and was awarded a special prize of £50 by the National Gallery Trustees for her picture The Letter.

Withers was engaged to fellow student, John (Jack) Martin Paterson, who dedicated a sketch of a kitten to her while a soldier during World War 1. He was killed in action at Villers-Bretonneux in August 1918. In 1927 Withers married Richard Matthew McCann, an artist and a founding member of Twenty Melbourne Painters.

Withers painted figures and landscapes in both oil and watercolours, and taught art at Swinburne College for several years, though as a married woman she was asked to resign in 1928 and reapply for a temporary position, without benefits. Her work has been described as "finding charm in every shadow and light under her brush."

She painted at Tawonga, Diamond Creek, and Heidelberg, and exhibited with the Victorian Artists Society and the Twenty Melbourne Painters Society. She also showed with artists such as Polly Hurry, Jo Sweatman, and A.M.E. Bale.

Withers has works in the collections of the Art Gallery of New South Wales, the Castlemaine Art Gallery and Historical Museum, the University of Western Australia and the State Library Victoria. Her portrait of her husband Richard McCann was shortlisted for the Archibald Prize in 1939.

Works 

1910,  Early Eltham looking towards Montmorency]
 ca. 1913–1922,  Nude study of a young woman
 ca. 1913–1922,  A Warrandyte Farm, near Frank Crozier's
 1920,  Kit Turner's Cottage, Eltham
 1920,  Souter's College, Eltham
 1920,  Studley Park
 ca. 1920–1940,  Christ Church, South Yarra
 1924,  Bridge and piers
 1932,  Yarra floods and North Balwyn from Ivanhoe-Boulevard
 1935,  Portrait of unidentified young woman
 1945,  Orchard country, North Eltham

Exhibitions 
 Walter and Margery Withers, Collins House, 1915
 Walter and Margery Withers (watercolours), Athenaeum Hall, 1916
 Solo exhibition, Athenaeum Gallery, 1919
 Twenty Melbourne Painters, Athenaeum Hall, 1921
 Group exhibition (Margery, Nancy & Meynell Withers), Athenaeum Hall, 1922
 Twenty Melbourne Painters, Athenaeum Hall, 1923
 Twenty Melbourne Painters, Athenaeum Hall, 1925
 Twenty Melbourne Painters 8th annual exhibition, Athenaeum Gallery, 1926
 Twenty Melbourne Painters, Athenaeum Hall, 1927
 Twenty Melbourne Painters 10th annual exhibition, Athenaeum Hall, 1928
 Solo exhibition, Athenaeum Gallery, 1929
 Twenty Melbourne Painters, Athenaeum Gallery, 1929
 Exhibition by Mr Ernest Buckmaster, Athenaeum Gallery, 1930
 Solo exhibition, Athenaeum Gallery, 1932
 Warrandyte Art Exhibition, Penleigh Boyd Studio, 1932
 Rookwood Gallery opening, 1933
 Heidelberg Art Show, 1934
 Twenty Melbourne Painters 16th annual exhibition, Athenaeum Gallery, 1934
 Twenty Melbourne Painters, Athenaeum Gallery, 1935
 Twenty Melbourne Painters 18th annual exhibition, Athenaeum Gallery, 1936
 Heidelberg "Inspiration of Landscape Art" exhibition, Heidelberg Town Hall, 1937
 Twenty Melbourne Painters, Athenaeum Gallery, 1938
 Heidelberg 3rd art exhibition, Ivanhoe Town Hall, 1940
 Launceston Art Society (Twenty Melbourne Painters), Queen Victoria Museum, 1943
 Twenty Melbourne Painters 26th annual exhibition, Athenaeum Gallery, 1944
 Twenty Melbourne Painters, Athenaeum Gallery, 1945
 Twenty Melbourne Painters, Athenaeum Gallery, 1947
 Twenty Melbourne Painters, Athenaeum Gallery, 1948

Further reading 
Papers of Margery Withers, ca. 1900-1966 [manuscript], State Library Victoria
Margery Withers: Australian art and artists file, State Library Victoria

References 

1890 births
1966 deaths
20th-century Australian women artists
20th-century Australian artists
Archibald Prize finalists
People from Ivanhoe, Victoria
Artists from Melbourne
English emigrants to colonial Australia
National Gallery of Victoria Art School alumni